WPL (Windows Media Player Playlist) is a computer file format that stores multimedia playlists.  It is a proprietary file format used in Microsoft Windows Media Player versions 9–12.  The elements of WPL files are represented in XML format.  The top-level element, smil, specifies that the file's elements follow the SMIL (Synchronized Multimedia Integration Language) structure.

The file is saved with the "wpl" filename extension and its MIME type is application/vnd.ms-wpl.

Example
Here is an example of a wpl file.
<?wpl version="1.0"?>
<smil>
    <head>
        <meta name="Generator" content="Microsoft Windows Media Player -- 11.0.5721.5145"/>
        <meta name="AverageRating" content="33"/>
        <meta name="TotalDuration" content="1102"/>
        <meta name="ItemCount" content="3"/>
        <author/>
        <title>Bach Organ Works</title>
    </head>
    <body>
        <seq>
            <media src="\\server\vol\music\Classical\Bach\OrganWorks\cd03\track01.mp3"/>
            <media src="\\server\vol\music\Classical\Bach\OrganWorks\cd03\track02.mp3"/>
            <media src="SR15.mp3" tid="{35B39D45-94D8-40E1-8FC2-9F6714191E47}"/>
        </seq>
    </body>
</smil>

See also

 Other playlist file formats
 ASX - Windows media
 M3U - The most common playlist format
 PLS - SHOUTcast
 XSPF - Xiph.Org Foundation

References

Playlist file formats
Digital audio
Microsoft Windows multimedia technology
Playlist markup languages